Volt Czech Republic (Volt) is a social liberal political party in the Czech Republic and the Czech branch of Volt Europa.

History 
Volt Czech Republic was founded in 2019 and operated in the Czech Republic from 11 April 2021 to 28 June 2022 as a registered association Volt Česká Republika to prepare for party formation and collect signatures. The chairpersons of the association were Karolina Machová and Adam Hanka, and Jan Klátil was treasurer. On 29 June 2022 Volt Česko was registered and admitted as a party.

In the 2022 municipal election in Prague, the party contested an election for the first time and received 4,816 votes (0.14%).

In October 2022, Volt Czech Republic hosted the General Assembly of Volt Europa. The party is currently preparing to participate in the 2024 European elections.

Policies

European Policy 
As a European party, Volt strives to reform the European Union as a central goal. The party favours European federalism and supports greater European integration. The European Parliament is to be strengthened with the power to draft laws itself and to elect a prime minister of a European government. In addition, a common defence policy and a common European army are to be created. The right of veto of nation states is to be abolished in order to end the blockade within the EU.

Environmental protection, climate protection and mobility 
The party sees climate change as one of the greatest challenges to be met. In this context, Volt sees nuclear power as part of the energy mix in the transition to a carbon-neutral economy, but rejects the inclusion of gas in the EU Commission's green taxonomy. Coal mining in the country is to be ended, with the goal of a carbon-neutral Europe by 2040. To achieve this, solar energy and heat pumps, among other things, are to be promoted. In addition, a circular economy is to be achieved in the medium term in order to conserve resources. Local public transport is to be promoted and rail transport significantly expanded.

Social policy 
The party supports the LGBTQ movement and advocates marriage for all, as well as the introduction of the 3rd gender. Volt calls for the promotion of modern education, support for civil society and civic participation, the digitalisation of the state, and the promotion of equal rights. Social housing is to be promoted.

At the municipal level, the party advocates the introduction of councils for foreigners as an advisory body for municipal councils.

Economic policy 
Start-ups and new businesses should be promoted. The party supports the introduction of the Euro as a currency.

Organisation

Party Executive 
After the party was founded, the previous chairman of the association, Adam Hanka, was elected party chairman.

Finances 
The party is financed by donations from private individuals, while donations from companies and legal entities are prohibited. All donations are published in a transparency account and non-financial donations are published on the party's website.

External links 

 Official website

References 

Czech Republic
Pro-European political parties in the Czech Republic
Political parties established in 2022
2022 establishments in the Czech Republic
Social liberal parties